Civil libertarianism is a strain of political thought that supports civil liberties, or which emphasizes the supremacy of individual rights and personal freedoms over and against any kind of authority (such as a state, a corporation, social norms imposed through peer pressure and so on).

In the libertarian movement 
In the domain of libertarian philosophy, the primary concern of the civil libertarian is the relationship of the government to the individual. In theory, the civil libertarian seeks to restrict this relationship to an absolute minimum in which the state can function and provide basic services and securities without excessively interfering in the lives of its citizens. One key cause of civil libertarianism is upholding free speech. Specifically, civil libertarians oppose bans on hate speech and obscenity. Although they may or may not personally condone behaviors associated with these issues, civil libertarians hold that the advantages of unfettered public discourse outweigh all disadvantages, and that the coercion of speech is inherently evil irrespective of its advantages.

Other civil libertarian positions include support against involuntary commitment and outpatient commitment, support for at least partial legalization of illicit substances (marijuana and other soft drugs), prostitution, abortion, privacy, assisted dying or euthanasia, the right to keep and bear arms, youth rights, topfree equality, a strong demarcation between religion and politics, and support for same-sex marriage.

With the advent of personal computers, the Internet, email, cell phones and other information technology advances a subset of civil libertarianism has arisen that focuses on protecting individuals' digital rights and privacy.

See also 

 Civil liberties in the Democratic Republic of the Congo
 Civil liberties in Finland
 Civil liberties in Mali
 Civil liberties in New Zealand
 Civil liberties in the People's Republic of China
 Civil liberties in the United Kingdom
 Civil liberties in the United States
 Civil and political rights
 Cultural liberalism
 Libertarianism
 Liberty

References

Citations

Works cited

Activism
Civil rights and liberties
Liberalism
Libertarianism by form